Syrian Christianity may refer to:

- in territorial terms: 
 Christianity in Syria - Christianity on the territory of Syria, historical or modern 

- in denominational terms:
 variant term for Syriac Christianity in general, including:
 East Syrian Christianity, variant term for Christian communities of the East Syriac Rite
 West Syrian Christianity, variant term for Christian communities of the West Syriac Rite
 Syrian Christianity in India, variant term for all communities of Saint Thomas Christians, in India

See also
 Syrian (disambiguation)
 Syriac (disambiguation)